China Grove is an unincorporated community in Pike County, Alabama, United States, located  north of Troy.

History
The community is likely named after local chinaberry trees. A post office operated under the name China Grove from 1830 to 1905. China Grove was one of the first settled areas in Pike County.

References

Unincorporated communities in Pike County, Alabama
Unincorporated communities in Alabama